In differential geometry, Bernstein's problem is as follows: if the graph of a function on Rn−1 is a minimal surface in Rn, does this imply that the function is linear? 
This is true in dimensions n at most 8, but false in dimensions n at least 9.  The problem is named for Sergei Natanovich Bernstein who solved the case n = 3 in 1914.

Statement

Suppose that f is a function of n − 1 real variables. The graph of f is a surface in Rn, and the condition that this is a minimal surface is that f satisfies the minimal surface equation

Bernstein's problem asks whether an entire function (a function defined throughout Rn−1 ) that solves this equation is necessarily a degree-1 polynomial.

History

 proved Bernstein's theorem  that a graph of a real function on R2 that is also a minimal surface in R3 must be a plane.

 gave a new proof of Bernstein's theorem by deducing it from the fact that there is no non-planar area-minimizing cone in R3.

 showed that if there is no non-planar area-minimizing cone in Rn−1 then the analogue of Bernstein's theorem is true in Rn, which in particular implies that it is true in R4.

 showed there are no non-planar minimizing cones in R4, thus extending Bernstein's theorem to R5.

 showed there are no non-planar minimizing cones in R7, thus extending Bernstein's theorem to R8. He also gave examples of locally stable cones in R8 and asked if they were globally area-minimizing.

 showed that Simons' cones are indeed globally minimizing, and showed that in Rn for n≥9 there are graphs that are minimal but not hyperplanes. Combined with the result of Simons, this shows that the analogue of Bernstein's theorem is true in dimensions up to 8, and false in higher dimensions.
A specific example is the surface .

References

 German translation in

External links
 Encyclopaedia of Mathematics article on the Bernstein theorem

Differential geometry